Douglas Jarvie Clelland (born 13 May 1945) is a Scottish architect, educator and writer.

As an architect, he has practised as Clelland Associates (1972–1996), Aire Design (1996–2007) and JARVIE Architecture and Writing (2015–2022). His most recent completed building is an extension to the Mulberry House School in London. He has also acted as a design consultant to JIG Architects (2007–2015). His recent teaching positions include Herbert Rowse Professor of Architecture and Urban Design at Liverpool John Moores University (1994–2010) and professor of architecture at the Beuth University of Applied Sciences in Berlin (2013–2016). He is currently emeritus professor at Liverpool John Moores University and continues to teach in Berlin. He has written extensively as an academic, and has written non-architectural works including God's Brains and Joyful Darkness.

Summary
Doug Clelland was born in Glasgow in May 1945 and attended Eastbank Primary School until the age of nine. He completed his schooling at Hutchesons' Boys Grammar School.

In 1963, he commenced part-time architectural education at the Glasgow School of Art. He moved to London in 1966, then in 1967 to Canada and the United States, working for different architects. He completed his formal architectural education at the Architectural Association School of Architecture in London, obtaining his diploma in architecture in 1970.

He was influenced by Dalibor Vesely and worked with him on a collaborative project for Kentish Town, London in 1972.

He taught at the Architectural Association from 1971 to 1975, sharing units with Daniel Libeskind and Dalibor Vesely. He then worked at the Polytechnic of Central London (PCL), where he ran the urban architecture studio until 1988.

Maintaining bases in London and Berlin, he participated in the Internationale Bauausstellung (1984–1987), was a member of a series of juries for competitions in post-1989 Berlin, and completed two buildings there, one for Siemens.

From 1989 to 1991, Clelland lived largely in his home city of Glasgow. During its time as European Capital of Culture in 1990, he conceived and managed the keynote event Glasgow's Glasgow.

He returned to teaching in 1994 as the Herbert James Rowse Professor of Architecture and Urban Design at Liverpool John Moores University, where he remained until 2010. Since then he has acted as a professor of architecture at the Beuth University of Applied Sciences in Berlin and professor of architecture at the University of Malta.

Clelland continues to practice as an architect and is the author of two non-architectural books. He divides his time between Oxfordshire, Gers in France and Berlin. He is the father of three daughters and one son.

Working life 

Clelland began his working life in 1963 in the Education Architecture Department of Glasgow Corporation, studying architecture at the Mackintosh School of Architecture part-time.

Moving to Toronto in 1967 following a year at Kingston School of Art, he worked in the office of John Andrews and then, when travelling in Canada and the United States for a year, he spent time working in the studios of American architects, including a period with Louis Kahn, whose thinking and work was influential.

Returning to the UK to complete his formal architectural education at the Architectural Association, he commenced private practice in 1972 and completed a set of small buildings in London, Nackington near Canterbury and Forgandenny in Perthshire. Continuing to have his base in London, the Weinreb Studio in Highgate, London (1988), received a Royal Institute of British Architects (RIBA) regional award and the Gartnernes Forsikring in Taastrup, Denmark (1989) a Danish design award.

His involvement with Berlin commenced in 1977 and since then, he has published a number of journals on the city, was involved in the Internationale Bauausstellung (IBA) from 1984 to 1987, and designed buildings for Siemens and GSW Immobilien. He was elected to the Berlin Architektenkammer in 1992.

He returned to full-time teaching in 1994 in Liverpool, and from 2010 until today, Clelland has mixed practice, teaching and writing – in recent years committing more time and resources to travel and, as with many colleagues and friends, to a reflection on globalisation.

Production

Buildings and projects

Glasgow Corporation 
 Primary school (1965). Design of a traditionally built primary school – during the amnesic era of CLASP.

Clelland Associates 

 Cornwall Mews, London (1974). Replacement of a two-storey mews house with a compact three-storey town house.
 Artington Court, Guildford (1975). The conversion and expansion of two barns into a family home and guest house.
 National Library, Tehran (1976). Interpretation of the tradition of stepped roof gardens, working with Pedro Geddes, Eric Parry and others.
 London Bridge Tower (1977). Working with Nigel Moor as planning consultant, a proposed scale well before its time.
 Millbank Housing (1977). With Eric Parry.
 Nackington Farm, Kent (1978 to 1984). Conservatory, Playroom, Hall, Dwelling, Orangery, Offices, Pond.
 Doll's House (1982). With Paul Sutton. Accessible 'cave', the exterior thematically exploring the world of nature.
 Centre for Physically Handicapped People, Gwent, Wales (1983). Single-storey building as a 'tartan grid' of interior and exterior spaces, public and private activities.
 Solid State Logic, Oxfordshire (1984). With Eric Parry. Offices and workshop exploring thermal mass technologies (now apartments).
 Oriental Museum, Durham (1984).

 Little Big House (1986). With Paul Sutton. Visualisation of the house described in John Crowley's fantasy novel Little Big.
  
 Gartnernes Forsikring, Copenhagen (1986). Offices and dwellings exploring an entry marker and an edge to the centre of a new town.

 10-12 Friedrichstraße, Berlin (1987). Refurbishment and the infill of two vacant 20-metre wide plots as mixed-function buildings, with a Deaf Persons' Cultural Centre at its core, utilising space on the first floor of all three buildings. Specific responsibility for the right hand building No 10.

 The Studio, London (1988 and 1996). With recent refurbishment by seventhdesign 7. Replacement of the garage of the original house (designed for a member of the Pilkington family) with an independent dwelling. Later, the integration of the two dwellings into one, with a glass-tread stair with red-sandstone walls at the interstice.

 Siemens VT, Berlin (1992). With Mike Stiff and Gavin Rae. An employment initiative on the line of the demolished Berlin Wall, acting as a component in the social re-integration of Neukölln (West) and Treptow (East), with an architecture exploring natural anodised aluminium – a radiant interpretation of the genius loci of Berlin Steinerne Stadt.
 British Embassy Competition, Berlin (1994). Entry for the invited competition for a Wilhelmstraße building.
 Paul-Lobe-Haus Competition, Berlin (1995). Entry for the invited competition for spaces for the Bundestag's parliamentary committees, and 900 offices for parliamentary deputies – on the Band des Bundes.

Aire Design 
 Théâtre abandonné (2002).
 Play Arena, Liverpool (2003).
 Clock, Leeds (2003).
 Library, Berlin (2004). Entry for the competition.

 Norris90 Social Housing, Liverpool (2004). Following the creation of a masterplan acceptable to the City Council, 90 adaptable, low-energy social dwellings, were designed and constructed – with numerous house-types.
 Formby Pool, Lancashire (2005). Entry for the invited competition.
 Giant's Causeway Visitor Centre (2005). Entry for the competition.
 Aire House, (2006). Self-motivated research into the world of housing in an age of profound need – with accent on variability, adaptability, speed of construction and easily managed zero-CO2 behaviour.
 Turner House, Crosby, Lancashire (2006). A zero  extension to the house where Joseph Mallord William Turner RA is reputed to have lived when painting on Merseyside.

 West Coast Energy, Mold, Wales (2007). Office building for a company focused on renewable energy production.
 St Hugh's Primary School, Liverpool (2007).

 Operation Desert Flower, Spain (2007). Research reinterpretation of the self-contained monastery – reversing desertification – inhabited and operated by volunteers on a six-month basis.
 Friedrich Gilly House, Berlin (2008).

Design consultant to JIG Architects 
 St Mary's Primary School, Middleton, Manchester (2009). Part refurbishment and part new build, with accent on the building's use as a community resource.
 Hendre Primary School, Carnarfon, Wales, Flintshire (2012). New school at the heart of three multiply-deprived communities, utilising a two-courtyard typology, around which pupils circulate as they move their class bases from Reception to Year Six. 
 Biofuels Processing Plant, Wales (2013).
 Centre for Wildlife Skills and Education, National Zoo of Wales, Colwyn Bay, Wales (2009 to present). Tropical House with a spatial accent on the interplay between animals, visitors and education.

JARVIE Architecture 
 Tri'Rhena, Basel, Switzerland (2013). Where the geographical boundaries of France, Germany and Switzerland intersect, an anchored circular building would emphasise the shared cultures of café, dance, music and restaurant.

 Guggenheim Galleries, Helsinki (2014). Entry for the competition, with Children's Art Tower.
 Zero CO2 Offices, Preston, England (2015).
 Theatre of the World, Berlin (2016). A Theatre of the World – a place where man's destiny, through drama and music, can throw light on the human condition. In a unique way, and at a place within a part of the city that is full of historical meaning, a floating theatre for an audience of 500 will provide space for groups from all continents to celebrate their own culture's contribution to the human drama that is unfolding.
 Bihar School (2016). Small part of voluntary UK-India activity.

 The Mulberry House School, London (2018). Vertical extension over a 1960s building that could sustain no further structural loads. A cube for learning served by a Beanstalk tower.

Masterplanning 

 Kentish Town, London (1972). With Dalibor Vesely, Yana Vesely and Donald Keen. Entry for a competition.
 
 Wilhelmstraße, Berlin (1981). Entry for the invited competition. Wilhelmstraße viewed as a volume for activity rather than a typology.
 Stuttgart West (1992). With Harper Mackay. Entry for the invited competition.

 Boulevard, Glasgow (1995). With Peter Wilson. Research into the creation of an urban edge to the eastern edge of the city centre.

 Central Edinburgh (1995). With Peter Wilson. Research into the activation of Princes Street Gardens as a forum for all the regions of Scotland.

 Marsham Street, London

 Allerton Bywater Millennium Community, Yorkshire (2001). Winning entry to the second Millennium Community competition.

 Osbaldwick, York (2002). Entry for the invited competition.

 Norris Green 'Boot Estate', Liverpool (2003). Winning entry to the invited developer-architect competition.
 Newton Aycliffe, County Durham (2006). Zero CO2 housing on the edge of the town.
 Bellgrove, Glasgow (2007).
 Narrows Island, Liverpool (2010). With Paul Jackson. Research into the transformation of the urban geography of Liverpool.

Exhibitions 
 Glenbow Museum – Calgary Projects – 'Towards a New Prairie Architecture' (1987).
 The Arches – Glasgow's Glasgow – (1990). Clelland directed and chaired the confederation of curators, performance artists, designers and architectural practices who, together, designed and managed the 6,000 square-metre 'Glasgow's Glasgow' exhibition in 1990, when Glasgow was 'European Capital of Culture'. The design of the installation presented the history, present and future of the city within a three-dimensional, analogous geography, with the River Clyde at its centre. A small-scale conventional theatre and sequences of 'street theatre' that moved through the exhibition, brought life to the city's story. This temporary event, a keynote to 1990, was developed in association with the Glasgow Development Agency, the local Regional / District Councils and Commercial Sponsors. It was attended by over 500,000 visitors, the largest audience at that time to visit a temporary exhibition in Britain. 'The Arches' remained as a functioning legacy until recently.

Selected seminars and consultations 
 Clelland has chaired conferences ranging from the London 'Goethe Institut' Symposium on 'Museum Design' in December 1986 – the 'Architecture Day' of 1987 at the ICA in London – the 'Banff Sessions' in Canada in 1988 – and 'Practice Management' at The Institute for Civil Engineering, London (1995).
 Chaired the Session 'Spaced Out: James Hubble and the Jardin de Ninõs' at the ICA, London (1995).
 He contributed a paper to 'Africa 2000', Cape Town (1995).
 Conference – Mind the Gap – Berlin for the British Council (2001).
 Special advisor to the community of 'Manzini Town', Kloof, Durban on spatial strategies for a new settlement for 10,000, close to existing white suburbs (2001 to 2004).
 Author of the Scottish Power architectural student competition for a 'Cultural Centre for the New Millennium' on the Esplanade of Stirling Castle (1993 to 1994).
 Special advisor to the Edinburgh bid for the 1999 'City of Architecture and Design' and author of the concept for the 'Millennial Retrospective' aspect of the bid (1997 to 1998).

Juries 
Jury member for a range of architectural competitions including:

 The first 'Berlin Architekturpreis', 1989.
 The Ideenwettbewerb 'Fernbanhof Spandau', 1992.
 The international 'Spreebogen Wettbewerb', for the new Government Quarter (Band des Bundes) Berlin, 1993.
 The Regeneration of Garston Centre, Liverpool, 2005.

Lectures 
Clelland has given numerous public lectures throughout his career.

Teaching

Architectural Association 
 Diploma School, Unit 1 Design Tutor – Unit Master, Dalibor Vesely (1971 to 1972).
 Intermediate School, Unit 6 Unit Master – With Daniel Libeskind (1973).
 Diploma School, Unit 1 – Unit Master (Terms 2 and 3) (1974 to 1975).
The continuation of the ideology and programme of philosophically grounded urban architecture, established by Dalibor Vesely, with summer school surveys of medieval French towns thrown in for added joie de vivre.

Polytechnic of Central London (PCL), now University of Westminster 
 First Year Tutor (1975).
 Diploma School, PCL Urban Architecture Unit (1976 to 1988).
Part of the successful drive under Allen Cunningham to establish PCL as a serious competitor to 34-36 Bedford Square.

University of Calgary School of Architecture 
Visiting professor of architecture, the University of Calgary School of Architecture, Alberta, Canada, 1986 and 1987. Design Studio and theory courses.

Mackintosh School of Architecture 
Final Year Studio Tutor, the Mackintosh School of Architecture, Glasgow, 1988 and 1989 during enabling work for the European Capital of Culture, 1990.

University of Malta 
Visiting professor of architecture, the University of Malta (2012 to 2014).

Liverpool John Moores University (JMU) 
 Herbert Rowse Professor of Architecture and Urban Design – 1994 to 2010.
Reworking the curriculum with the collaboration of colleagues – emphasis on urban re-vitalisation with Liverpool as a local laboratory. Growing enrolment numbers and institutional income.
 CityWorks and CultureWorks programmes at JMU (1996 to 2005).
Annual focus of work demonstrated in publications and public exhibitions / meetings.

Beykent University 
Author of the curriculum and visiting professor of architecture at Beykent University, Istanbul, Turkey (2005 to 2008).

Writing 
 Doctrines of the City
 Learning and Teaching
 Berlin and Antiquity
 Much Ado About Nothing – The Sainsbury Centre
 Walter Benjamin and Michael Graves
 Public Space – Interests, Prospects and Prejudices
 New Towns – Their Origins, Achievements and Progress
 We are more than rational beings – Hans Scharoun: Imagining Social Justice as City Landscape
 From Calm Poetry to Failed Epic – Some notes on Karl Friedrich Schinkel
 Karl Friedrich Schinkel – Collected Architectural Designs
 Post-War Berlin
 Architecture in Progress – The Wilhelmstraße Project by Douglas Clelland
 Architecture in the Middle
 Berlin – An Architectural History
 Celebrating 1984
 Ludwig Hoffman – Prolific Historicist
 Britische Architektur Heute
 Gadamer, Hermeneutics and Architecture
 Anchoring the Architectural
 Is there a British Tradition?
 Stadtluft macht Frei
 Berlin as Model – Project for Friedrichstraße 10
 Berliner Ensemble and Berlin Variations
 Four of a Kind
 Withdrawal Symptoms
 The Architecture of Tom Beeby and Michael Graves
 Pieces of Eight
 Ungers Gateways
 Berlin: Origins to IBA – In our Times
 David und Friedrich Gilly
 Preface for The Words And The Stones, by Carl MacDougall
 Glasgow's Glasgow – A Tour of the Exhibition
 Hello to Berlin II
 Power Games
 Idol Work
 My Kind of Town
 Inhabiting the Void, not the Vacuum, between tradition and liberation
 Striking out on the Path of Urban Regeneration: Some Features of the Landscape, some Temptations among the Trees
 CityWorks1 – Liverpool 2046
 Liverpool: Going into the cellar for a handle on a future – some preliminary notes on the new modern architecture
 CityWorks2 – Nature and Architecture: Visions for Liverpool
 The Museum of Scotland
 Designs on the future of the entire nation – the proposed Scottish Parliament
 CityWorks3 – Architecture and Urban Design: Visions for Liverpool 2
 Genes-Dreams-Designs:  Tourism and the creation of future heritage
 On the architecture of Architecture – constructing the curricula for the future
 CityWorks4 – Architecture and the Urban Renaissance: The generic and the particularity of Liverpool, studies for the Compact City
 Cars and the Future Home
 On the Establishment of New Communities – Allerton Bywater and Osbaldwick Fields
 Tourism and Future Heritage: Genes - Dreams – Designs, or the Engaging Syndrome of S, S and S
 LiverpoolCityWorks – Acts of Dynamic Recovery
 CityWorks5 – Moving On: The Centre for Architecture and its New Cycle of Renewal, studies for The Strand
 Speaking of the Sainsbury Centre
 Human Lava and the Pompeii Factor
 Mind the Gap: Berlin–London – Introduction: Density and Urban Lifestyle in London
 The Liverpool Vision with the buzz of Civic Life
 From CityWorks to CultureWorks – Broom at the Bin or Room at the Inn? The Year 2000 Studio
 CultureWorks1 – Urbs in Horto
 The Lowry Centre
 CultureWorks2 – Urbs in Horto 2
 True Grit or Too Grim
 Masterplans for the Twenty-First Century
 Blackpool in Focus
 Chester in Focus
 Carlisle in Focus
 Berlin 1989 – 2009: Reviving the principles of the European city
 God's Brains – The Surging Tide of Humanity
 Joyful Darkness – Entangled in the Invisible

Reports 

 Assignment for the CPRE The Isle of Wight – Policies for Sustainability (1977).
 Assignment for English Partnerships 'Comparing Recent Housing: Case Studies from Leeds and Wakefield and the relative position of the second Millennium Community at Allerton Bywater in West Yorkshire', which traced the extent of innovation triggered by recent government policies (2003).

Selected publications on projects and buildings 
 1983 – Hardware Deutsche Bauzeitung, 12/83, pp 32–35
 1984 – Headquarters Building for Solid State Logic Ltd A+U, Japan, 4/84, pp 51–58
 1989 – Photo Electric Effect Home Entertainment Design, Autumn 1989, pp 27–33
 1983 – Junge Architekten in Europa Kohlhammer Verlag, pp 121–122
 1988 – Eksperimentel Bybygning, Høje Tåstrup, Denmark, Arkitektur No 7, pp 334–335
 1988 – New bricks for old – The Studio, Highgate, London, The Times, 31 December
 1988 – House in Highgate by Brian Hatton, RIBA Journal, December, pp 36–41
 1989 – Vittigt og vanvittigt by Martin Hartung, Berlingske Bolig, 5 November
 1990 – Redefining the Urban Edge by Nils-Ole Lund, Architecture Today, no 4, pp 34–39
 1990 – Glasgow's Glasgow – The Exhibition, MacMag 15, pp 3–7
 1990 – Cultural Collisions and Glasgow's Glasgow, Building Design, 1 June
 1990 – Local Attraction, Critique of Glasgow's Glasgow, Museums Journal, July' pp 23–26
 1990 – City within a City's Arches by Jeremy Myerson, World Architecture, No 9, pp 78–79
 1990 – Glasgow's Glasgow by Brian Hatton The Architectural Review, Nov. 1990, pp 79–81
 1990 – Stuttgart - Ideas for the Urban Block, Architecture Today, No. 12, pp 19
 1991 – Glasgow's Glasgow: mehr als nur eine Ausstellung by Wolgang Schäche, Bauwelt, 18 January, pp 74 – 75
 1991 – Glasgow without the cultural hype by John McKean, Building Design, March, pp 12
 1991 – Douglas Clelland Associates, Progex, 06 Giugno, pp 4–11
 1992 – Wagamama, Design Review, Issue 5, Volume 2, pp 22
 1992 – Exposed to the Elements, The Siemens Building in Treptow, Berlin, Building Design, 24 July
 1993 – Nye Huse: Skaber liv i byen, Block 17 in Høje Tåstrup, Bo Bedre, May, pp17
 1993 – Company Account, Siemens Verkehrstechnik Berlin Building, RIBA Journal, Dec. 1993, pp 25–31
 1994 – Table Manners – Clelland on Friedrichstraße, Architecture Today, No 50, pp 20–26
 1994 – ScottishPower Architectural Students Competition: Catalogue, Stirling.
 1994 – A Guide to London's Contemporary Architecture, pp 89, The Studio, Highgate
 1994 – Catalogue to the Aedes Galerie exhibition Douglas Clelland shown in Berlin in October 1994.
 1995 – Berlin Embassy – Pursuing a subtle diplomacy – critique of the competition, Clare Melhuish, Building Design, March 3, pp 8
 1995 – Clelland on Friedrichstraße – review, Architektura & Biznes No.8
 1995 – World Cities - Berlin, edited by Alan Balfour. The Siemens (Treptow) Building, pp 290–293
 1997 – Foreign Affairs – The British Embassy Building in Berlin, Birkhäuser Verlag AG.
 1998 – 150 Jahre Architektur für Siemens – Wolfgang Schäche, Gebr. Mann Verlag, pp 158.
 1999 – Clelland Wins Allerton Bywater, Architects Journal, 27 May 1999
 1999 – Cover of July Building Homes 'Airefix Kit: How to assemble the Mk II Millennium Village Model' and 'Breath of fresh Aire', pp 22–30.
 2000 – RIBA Journal: various articles on the Allerton Bywater Millennium Community project.
 2001 – Homes of the future, Architects Journal, 8 February.
 2008 – Summarising ideas, RIBA Journal, November.
 2019 – Bridge Partners – Mulberry School expands upwards', Architecture Today: February and Bridge Partners.

Citations

General 
 Philip Johnson, one of the key American architects of the past century, wrote referring to the Solid-State-Logic Building, Stonesfield, Oxfordshire, "Clelland: Postmodern, an English Country Church as a laboratory".
 Brian Hatton, the widely published architectural critic, wrote regarding The Weinreb House, "Already mentioned are the urban and ecclesiastical overtones of the house's form, as well as its theatrical connotations; others also come to mind: a gallery or shop typically disposes 'backstage' service rooms around a 'display stage', whilst the type of an openwork cage rising within the enclosed court has become the characteristic image of the 'new urban atrium". This building received an RIBA Regional Design Award.
 The celebrated Danish architect Nils-Ole Lund, referring to Gartnernes Forsikring Building, writes, "Apart from Aalto, Doug Clelland is the first foreign architect to build in Denmark for 300 years. The result has been hailed as the end of Danish functionalism ... Despite its modest size, it represents a whole exhibition of how to make a house ... The new town centre now has a remarkable landmark on its edge". The Danish Design Diploma awarded to Doug Clelland's building for the Gartnernes Forsikring reads, "For a Good and Beautiful Building".

The Weinreb House, London 
 Brian Hatton, the widely published architectural critic wrote, referring to The Friedrichstrasse 10 Building, "One of the last projects to be completed in the Berlin IBA, the Society for the Deaf building on Friedrichstrasse by Doug Clelland makes poetry out of an exceptionally complex brief."

Siemens Building, Treptow, Berlin 
 Karl Engemann, board member of Siemens in Germany writes, regarding the Siemens Building, Treptow, "We thank all those participating in the planning and construction of this building who, due to outstanding teamwork, created in the shortest time a landmark which expresses the visions and strategic aims of Siemens in shape, colour and function."
 Professor Dr Wolfgang Schäche writes, regarding the Siemens Building, Treptow, "Doug Clelland has succeeded in designing this building with a balance between ideas and building."
 Alan Balfour writes of Doug Clelland's Siemen's building, "The result is a structure which links with existing buildings, develops uses compatible with the surrounding residential buildings, and rejects Tradition and Liberation. At the same time it has traditional echoes and a 'lightness' of social and architectural intention."

Glasgow's Glasgow Exhibition 
 Peter Davey, the then editor of The Architectural Review wrote, regarding Glasgow's Glasgow Exhibition, "I've been coming to Glasgow for over 20 years, and although I know the riches in the museums, I've never seen anything like Glasgow's Glasgow. Not in Glasgow, that is. I've seen things like it in Berlin, in Vienna, in Barcelona. They are the peers for comparison, in terms of both cities and exhibitions. If the city stood the comparison as well as this inspiring exhibition, it would be clear that Glasgow had recovered the pre-eminence it had in 1890.", "Together they have shaped the knowledge represented by over 2500 objects, plus hours of film and video, into a pattern: an interlace, to stir visitors' imaginations into putting things together from Glasgow's past to make a leap into its future", "It is the architecture of space, finally which gives this exhibition the power of a symbol ... a model to Britain's other northern cities."
 The widely published architectural critic Brian Hatton, reviews the exhibition Glasgow's Glasgow that Doug Clelland conceived, designed and managed, wrote, "Architect Doug Clelland is its conceiver, but he has really been the convener of a team of historians and designers ... It is this architecture of space, finally, which gives this exhibition the power of a symbol – and, incidentally, renders to the city a permanent venue of assembly, performance and display ... This is an exhibition I'd like to take a child around. And a few of my fellow Liverpudlians, too; for this is a model to Britain's other northern cities."
 The Berlin architect and writer Professor Wolfgang Schäche wrote of the exhibition Glasgow's Glasgow, "Five hundred thousand visitors saw this lively, colourful and imaginative self-dramatization of the city. In this respect, it was the UK's most successful post-war temporary exhibition. In dazzling multiplicity and with myriad associations, the visitor could create for himself a well-balanced vision of Glasgow past, present and future."
 Andrew Gibbon William wrote, "The great strength of the exhibition lies in its refusal to sanitize Glasgow's history. It covers the slums, the disastrous post-war housing schemes and the collapse of the city's heavy industry. The fine arts share the stage with football and beer. Questions are asked about Glasgow's future. What emerges ... is the personality of Glaswegians."
 Penny Wright reports, "'Tearing it Down' takes a critical look at Glasgow's fragmented urban fabric. But even here, amidst the bleakest aspects of Glasgow, there is room for dreams. Referring to housing conditions, a panel explains that 'the dream is that the cycle of change will improve the lives of the many and not merely the few'. On a personal scale, the sentiment could equally apply to Clelland's dream that the exhibition should entertain and enrich the lives of the many. Judging by the hordes of visitors I saw his dream has already been realised."

Guest-edited journals 
 Wolf Von Eckhart, Hon AIA, design critic for the Washington Post and Time magazine, wrote, "Clelland's anthology is most helpful in the issue on Postwar Berlin because we don't know as much as we should about the architecture of the two Berlins of today."

The Mulberry House School extension 
 Chris Foges, regarding The Mulberry House School extension, writes "An inventive solution has enabled Mulberry House School to expand upwards."

Professor at Liverpool John Moores University 
 Dr Robert G MacDonald, when Doug Clelland opened the Andrew Fekete exhibition "In Quest of Gold" at The Victoria Building Liverpool University in 2018: "As the Herbert Rowse Professor of Architecture and Urban Design, Doug Clelland led The School of Architecture at Liverpool John Moore's University between 1994 and 2010. He brought great architectural knowledge and experience of practice to the school and through his invitation, a number of famous architects were visiting critics, external examiners and delivered high profile lectures. Doug was very generous with his professional advice. He was especially knowledgeable about the Urban and Architectural History of Berlin. He was convivial company and famously brought, and shared, a bottle of the best Scotch Malt Whisky to a staff meeting. A series of such staff workshops convened by the new professor, completely altered the curriculum, orienting it towards architecture being part of the drive to confront Climate Change and to relate closely to the vitality of cities. During his tenure, the student numbers in the Architecture programmes quadrupled, with the highest increases at Post-graduate level. Doug left LJMU with a wonderful legacy of publications of Black Books, Yellow Books and Exhibition Catalogues; all graphically very strong and containing drawn and modelled speculative projects especially, but not solely, for The City Region of Merseyside. All the projects anticipated the future of Liverpool in Planning, Transportation, Urban Design and Architecture. His research and teaching was way ahead of its time with regard to urban sustainability and he encouraged my own future socio-architectural thinking related to design for public health and mental well-being."
 Hartie Hartman, regarding the West Coast Energy Building, wrote, "West Coast Energy approached the RIBA to recommend architects for its new offices in Mold, North Wales. Of the six practices suggested by the client advisory service, Aire Design's 'passion shone through above anyone else.' The architects used thoughtful passive design to minimise the need for renewables. The airtightness test, performed by Stroma, achieved an astonishing 2.65m3/(hr.m2). Aire Design's design approach to West Coast Energy's offices achieves zero-carbon. Doug Clelland's view is that there is no single route to achieving zero carbon, but rather a series of strategies that work with building biology and a specific site. More practices should adopt this holistic approach." This building also received a Building Control award regarding is sustainability credentials.

Other interests and activities 
Clelland has served on the City of London and Westminster Society of Architects (CLAWSA) branch of the RIBA, and on the Council of the Architectural Association School of Architecture, London. He has served as a Governor of the Bramber Nursery School in Fulham, West London. He has been an invigilator and reader for the RIBA on the Dissertation Medal in 1994, 1995 and 1996 and has been Chairman of the Projects Committee of the Merseyside Civic Society. He has been a participant in the Standing Conference for Heads of Schools of Architecture (SCHOSA) and has been active in the European Association for Architectural Education (EAAE).

Doug has been married four times and has four children.

His main interests include other people, the history of human ideas, and the preference of substance over superficiality. Thinking, wondering, conversing, writing, travelling, reading, sketching and walking are Clelland's principal leisure activities.

Gallery

References

Architects from Glasgow
1945 births
Living people